Greatest Hits is a compilation album by The Notorious B.I.G. The album was released on March 6, 2007 by Bad Boy Records and Atlantic Records, three days before the 10th anniversary of his death.

The album was criticized for not containing many of the Notorious B.I.G.'s biggest hits, including: "Mo Money Mo Problems", "Going Back to Cali", "Player's Anthem" and "Sky's the Limit". It was also criticized as an unnecessary release, given the limited amount of material which the Notorious B.I.G. released in his lifetime and the inferior quality of his posthumously-published work.

Greatest Hits debuted on the U.S. Billboard 200 at number one in the issue dated March 14, 2007, with 100,000 copies sold in its first week of release. As of 2019, it is the last greatest hits album to debut at the number one position on the Billboard 200. It is B.I.G's 3rd US #1 on the Billboard 200.

The album sold 178,702 units in four weeks. The album has been certified Platinum by both the BPI and RIAA and has sold over 1,003,000 copies in the US to date.

Track listing

Charts

Weekly charts

Year-end charts

Certifications

References

2007 greatest hits albums
The Notorious B.I.G. albums
Albums produced by DJ Premier
Albums produced by Jazze Pha
Albums produced by Soopafly
Compilation albums published posthumously
Bad Boy Records compilation albums